"Last Night I Dreamt That Somebody Loved Me" is a power ballad by the English rock band the Smiths, written by singer Morrissey and guitarist Johnny Marr. It appears as the sixth track on the band's final album Strangeways, Here We Come (1987). Featuring a backdrop of crowd noises from the miners' strike of 1984–85, the song is a favorite of both Morrissey and Marr.

The song was released as the third and final UK single from Strangeways in December 1987. Billed as "The Last Single" as the band had already broken up, it reached number 30 in the UK Singles Chart.

Despite its commercial underachievement, "Last Night I Dreamt That Somebody Loved Me" has seen critical acclaim for Marr's guitar work and Morrissey's sombre lyricism. It has since appeared on multiple compilation albums and has been ranked by music writers as one of the band's best songs.

Background
Guitarist Johnny Marr wrote the chord sequence for "Last Night I Dreamt That Somebody Loved Me" after a Smiths concert in October 1986 in Carlisle. The piano intro was composed separately. Marr later explained:

The album version contains a one-minute and 55-second introduction, consisting of piano playing against a backdrop of crowd noises from the miners' strike of 1984–85. The 7" single release does not include the introduction, while the 12" single does. Both Morrissey and Johnny Marr, the co-writers, have nominated it as the best Smiths song.

Marr has called the song "the best thing we'd done" and "my favorite track at the time and probably still is." In a 1993 interview, Marr commented, "Strangeways has its moments, like 'Last Night I Dreamt That Somebody Loved Me'. Last time I met Morrissey he said it was his favorite Smiths song. He might be right."

Release
"Last Night I Dreamt That Somebody Loved Me" was released as the final single from the band's 1987 album Strangeways, Here We Come. As the band had disbanded prior to the release of Strangeways, the release was billed on posters as "The Last Single." Ultimately, the single peaked at number 30 in the UK, continuing the underwhelming chart positioning of its predecessor, "I Started Something I Couldn't Finish."

Morrissey later reflected on the commercial shortcomings of the final two Strangeways singles:

Artwork and matrix message
The cover of the single featured a photograph of the 1950s and 1960s-era British singer Billy Fury.

The British 7" and 12" vinyls contained the matrix message: "THE RETURN OF THE SUBMISSIVE SOCIETY" (X) STARRING SHERIDAN WHITESIDE/
"THE BIZARRE ORIENTAL VIBRATING PALM DEATH" (X) STARRING SHERIDAN WHITESIDE. Sheridan Whiteside was one of Morrissey's pseudonyms, taken from the protagonist of the play The Man Who Came to Dinner; that character was in turn based on dramatic critic and raconteur Alexander Woollcott and had been referenced in the etchings of the single "I Started Something I Couldn't Finish".

Morrissey initially sought to etch "Eaten by Vince Eager on the vinyl single, but changed his mind after being warned of potential blowback.

Critical reception
"Last Night I Dreamt That Somebody Loved Me" saw critical acclaim from its release. Reviewing Strangeways, Here We Come in 1987, the NME named it one of the two songs on the album amongst "Morrissey/Marr's greatest moments since the Fab Four's inception" (the other being "I Won't Share You"), writing, "it's as great as 'I Know It's Over'." Smash Hits wrote at the time, "If you fail to be moved by songs like 'Last Night I Dreamt That Somebody Loved Me', then you're missing out on a beautiful experience."

Rolling Stone ranked the song as the 23th best Smiths song, stating, "Playing this song together, the Smiths all sound intimately in sync." while NME named it the band's 19th best. Consequence ranked the song as the band's 18th best, noting that the song has "one of The Smiths' most explicitly hopeless choruses". 

Andre 3000 of OutKast told MTV in 2003, "I personally wish I would have written that Smiths song, 'Last Night I Dreamt That Somebody Loved Me.' Genius song."

Track listing

Charts

Covers
Alternative band Low also covered the song, initially as a single, and later included it on their A Lifetime of Temporary Relief: 10 Years of B-Sides and Rarities. In the booklet, the band describes it as "another cover that some may sneer at. After this, nothing is sacred". Grant-Lee Phillips covered this song for his 1980s covers album Nineteeneighties.

A cover by Eurythmics appears on the 2005 reissue of their 1989 album We Too Are One. A bootleg copy of the band performing the song live during their Peace tour appeared in the early 2000s, although the studio version was recorded in 2004.

References

The Smiths songs
1987 singles
Songs written by Morrissey
Songs written by Johnny Marr
Rock ballads
Songs about loneliness